Islands is a Canadian drama film, directed by Martin Edralin and released in 2021. The film stars Rogelio Balagtas as Joshua, a Filipino Canadian man in his late 40s who has sacrificed his own happiness to care for his aging parents Alma (Vangie Alcasid) and Reynaldo (Esteban Comilang); following his mother's death, his cousin Marisol (Sheila Lotuaco) comes to visit and offers to help care for Reynaldo, leading Joshua to confront what he really wants in life when he begins to experience misplaced feelings of falling in love with Marisol.

Edralin has described the film as inspired in part by the archetype of the "maiden aunt" who stays with her parents and never marries or builds her own independent life, and by a desire to explore that story from the less familiar perspective of a man in the same situation.

The film received production funding from Telefilm Canada's Talent to Watch funding program in 2018. Edralin had originally planned to set the film in the Philippines, but subsequently decided to tell it as a story about Filipino immigrants in Canada.

The film premiered at the 2021 SXSW Film Festival, where Balagtas won the Special Jury Prize for Breakthrough Performance.

Critical response
Barry Hertz of The Globe and Mail praised the film, writing that "Alternately buoyant and heartbreaking, Edralin’s film moves with the kind of carefully calibrated speed that is deeply impressive for a first-timer. So much happens to Joshua over the course of Islands, yet also not that much. Every moment – a minor embarrassment, a brief sliver of hope – only feels momentous because Edralin has created such a relatable, alive underdog of a character. Joshua is a man who we all think we might know – perhaps someone from the periphery of our own lives – but one whose interior life we never gave much thought. Joshua’s richness as a character, though, may have delivered less of an impact if not for Balagtas. With just a short film to his name prior to joining Islands, the Winnipeg actor delivers an honest, stripped-down performance so real that it seems lifted from a documentary. Of course, the actor’s virtual anonymity helps, but there is a deliberate, professional control to Balagtas’ work here that bears the hallmark of a gifted actor."

Awards

References

External links
 

2021 films
2021 drama films
Canadian drama films
Films directed by Martin Edralin
Films about Asian Canadians
Films about Filipino families
2020s Canadian films